The Blanchard House near Boyce, Louisiana was built in 1891 and was added to the National Register of Historic Places in 1982.

References

Houses on the National Register of Historic Places in Louisiana
Houses in Rapides Parish, Louisiana
National Register of Historic Places in Rapides Parish, Louisiana